USS LST-908 was an  in the United States Navy. Like many of her class, she was not named and is properly referred to by her hull designation.

Construction
LST-908 was laid down on 14 February 1944, at Hingham, Massachusetts, by the Bethlehem-Hingham Shipyard; launched on 28 March 1944; sponsored by Mrs. Charles E. Monorief; and commissioned on 8 May 1944.

Service history
During World War II, LST-908 was assigned to the Asiatic-Pacific theater. She took part in the Leyte landings, in October and November 1944; the 
Luzon operations, the Mindoro landings, in December 1944, and the Lingayen Gulf landings, in January 1945; the Zambales-Subic Bay operations, in January 1945; and the Assault and occupation of Okinawa Gunto, in June 1945.

Immediately following World War II, LST-908 performed occupation duty in the Far East until early April 1946. Upon her return to the United States, she was decommissioned on 30 July 1946, and struck from the Navy list on 28 August, that same year. On 3 October 1947, the ship was sold to Luria Bros. & Co., Philadelphia, Pennsylvania, for scrapping.

Awards
LST-908 earned four battle star for World War II service.

Notes

Citations

Bibliography 

Online resources

External links
 

 

LST-542-class tank landing ships
World War II amphibious warfare vessels of the United States
Ships built in Hingham, Massachusetts
1944 ships